The 3rd GECF summit was a biennial Gas Exporting Countries Forum summit, an international relations conference attended by the heads of state or heads of government of most member states of the GECF. The summit was held in Tehran, Iran, the first time the city has hosted the summit. Iran assumed the chair of the GECF from Russia on 1 January 2014.

Background
The summit was announced during the first meeting of the High-Level Ad Hoc Group for the 3rd Gas Summit on 20 May 2015. The group also discussed the draft summit declaration and other issues.

Participating leaders
Full members:

Observer members:

Special Guest:

Final communique
The final communique underscored the need  for stronger cooperation, including the transfer of expertise and pricing mechanisms. It also called for cooperation in the security of natural gas supplies to the global markets. It further objected to the application of extraterritorial laws, regulations and economic sanctions within the sector against the GECF member states.

Bilateral meetings

Russian President Vladimir Putin met Iranian Supreme Leader Ayatollah Ali Khamenei. The two discussed "issues in bilateral relations, including atomic energy, oil and gas, and military-technical cooperation," according to his Putin's foreign policy aide, Yuri Ushakov. Putin also met Iranian President Hassan Rouhani.

References

2015 conferences
2015 in international relations
2015 in Iran
21st-century diplomatic conferences
Diplomatic conferences in Iran
Gas Exporting Countries Forum
November 2015 events in Iran